Zvezdan Đorđilović is a Serbian footballer. Besides Serbia, he has played in Bosnia and Herzegovina, North Macedonia, and Jamaica.

Career

In 2015, he signed for FK Borac Banja Luka.

Registering with Montego Bay United's 2016/17 lineup through fellow Serbian coach Slaviša Božičić to gain experience, Đorđilović first started away at Reno, heading back to Serbia the second half of the season. Positioned on the left side with MoBay, the Serb stated that football clubs in his home country are more organized, and that he and Božičić were part of a plan improve Montego Bay's structure. He also recalled that there were around 8000 spectators each game, and that the locals were phlegmatic and relaxed.

In 2017, he signed for FK Sloboda Tuzla.

In 2021, he signed for FK Borac Cacak.

References

External links 
 Možda je kriva trava s Jamajke…
 at Soccerway 
 Fogis.se Profile 
 St. Catherine Football Association Profile

Serbian footballers
Serbian expatriate footballers
Serbian expatriate sportspeople in Jamaica
Expatriate footballers in Jamaica
Association football defenders
Montego Bay United F.C. players
Jamaican footballers
1994 births
Living people